Spontelectrics is a form of solid state thin films with some peculiar physical properties.

Properties 
When laid down as thin films tens to hundreds of molecular layers thick, a range of materials spontaneously generate large electric fields. The electric fields can be greater than 108 V/m.

Spontelectric behaviour is intrinsic to the dipolar nature of the constituent molecules.

The detection (in ~2009) of spontaneous electric fields in numerous solid films prepared by vapour deposition raises fundamental questions about the nature of disordered materials.

David Field played a major role in the discovery of spontelectrics.

External links
 Spontelectrics, or the solid state continues to surprise us
 Fysikoverraskelse: Elektrisk spænding opstår spontant i tyndfilm af lattergas
 Another way to sponteletrics.

References

Condensed matter physics